CCHL may stand for:

 Central Canada Hockey League
 Cytochrome c heme-lyase, or Holocytochrome-c synthase, an enzyme
 Christchurch City Holdings Ltd, New Zealand
 Communauté de communes of Haut-Livradois, a federation of Communes of the Puy-de-Dôme department, France
Canadian College of Health Leaders, establishers of the Certified Health Executive program